Randal Green (born 15 July 1961) is an Australian cricketer. He played four first-class matches for New South Wales between 1990/91 and 1993/94.

See also
 List of New South Wales representative cricketers

References

External links
 

1961 births
Living people
Australian cricketers
New South Wales cricketers
Cricketers from Melbourne